Wrightsville is the name of some places in the United States:

Wrightsville, Arkansas
Wrightsville, Georgia
Wrightsville, Missouri
Wrightsville, Adams County, Ohio
Wrightsville, Madison County, Ohio
Wrightsville, New Jersey
Wrightsville, Pennsylvania
Wrightsville, Wisconsin, a ghost town
Wrightsville Beach, North Carolina
 Wrightsville, a recurring fictional New England small town in the novels of Ellery Queen